Hayop Ka! (a profanity meaning "you animal!" in English), also known as Hayop Ka! (You animal!), Hayop Ka! The Nimfa Dimaano Story, and You Animal!, is a 2020 Philippine adult animated romantic comedy film directed by Avid Liongoren. It features a voice cast topbilled by Angelica Panganiban, Robin Padilla, and Sam Milby. Panganiban voices Nimfa, an anthropomorphic feline who works as a perfume salesperson and whose boyfriend, a mongrel named Roger (Padilla), is employed as a janitor. When Nimfa meets Iñigo (Milby), a wealthy dog with a career as a high-profile entrepreneur, she finds herself in the middle of a love triangle.

Produced by Rocketsheep Studio and Spring Films, the film was released on October 29, 2020, on Netflix in select territories. The film received generally positive reviews from international critics, with praise for animation and voice performances, but criticism for its plot and Padilla's performance.

Hayop Ka! was announced as an official selection for main competition at the 2021 Annecy International Animated Film Festival, became the first Filipino animated feature film. CNN Philippines and director Avid, announced that film's sequel is in development, naming it Hayop Ka Din!

Plot
In Manila, a feline named Nimfa Dimaano visits Manghuhula, an octopus fortune teller who divines that Nimfa will fall in love with two men at the same time, as well as have wild sex in the future. Nimfa works as a perfume salesperson at a mall department store, and is dating a muscular mongrel named Roger Europeo, a janitor who lives with Nimfa and frequently has sex with her. That night, Nimfa and Roger eat stew at a kiosk that they frequently visit. Roger casually proposes marriage to Nimfa and she declines, noting their lack of money. He suggests that Nimfa, who pays for their rent, stop paying for her sister Linda's school tuition, but she refuses, saying that she does not want her sister to be a dropout like she was.

While selling perfume at work one day, Nimfa is approached by Iñigo Villanueva, a wealthy dog with a career as a high-profile entrepreneur but also a secret sex addict. Nimfa helps Iñigo pick out a luxury perfume to give to his mother as a gift for her birthday. Iñigo suggests that he and Nimfa go out on a date, and gives her his business card. After work, Nimfa finds herself irritated by Roger, and rejects his sexual advances that night. At Iñigo's mother's birthday dinner, Iñigo gives her the present, which she unwraps to find a cheap cologne. Realizing that Nimfa gave him the wrong item, Iñigo finds Nimfa on social media and messages her about the mistake while she's in bed with Roger. They arrange to meet and have the cologne returned, and after doing so, Iñigo drives Nimfa home.

For their anniversary, Roger takes Nimfa to the stew kiosk. Nimfa ignores her meal, instead texting flirtatiously with Iñigo; the attention she gives to her phone causes Roger to feel suspicious. Later, Iñigo visits Nimfa at her job to pick up the correct perfume. He is accompanied by a hot female poodle named Marie, which makes Nimfa jealous. Iñigo senses Nimfa's jealousy, and discovers he is in love with both women. Despite this, he texts Nimfa again that night, telling her Marie is just a good friend, and invites her to go on a little trip with him the next day, which she reluctantly accepts. However, after Iñigo finishes with her, he joins Marie for champagne in his hot tub.

The next day, Iñigo brings Nimfa to a lavish seaside property in Batangas, wanting her to be his secretary for the day. Nimfa becomes so enticed by Iñigo, she even gets a nosebleed when he reaches across to buckle her seat belt, thinking he's trying to grope her breasts. When he insists that she spend the night, Nimfa calls her friend, a rabbit named Jhermelyn, and asks her to tell Roger that she is staying with her that night. After dinner, Nimfa walks in on a shrine of Iñigo's most recent girlfriend, Irene, who dumped him after he had an affair with Marie. Nimfa starts to reconsider her feelings towards Iñigo, but after she walks in on him while he's showering, the two become aroused by seeing each other naked and end up having sex.

The following day, Iñigo flies with Nimfa back to Manila in a helicopter. They visit Iñigo's mother and give her the correct perfume, and Iñigo drives Nimfa back home. Roger angrily confronts Nimfa for cheating on him, as Jhermelyn told him that Nimfa was not with her the previous night. Nimfa kicks Roger out of the house, feeling that making love to her is all he cares about. The day after, Nimfa arranges to meet Iñigo at the high-rise building where he works. Roger appears and pummels Iñigo's car, believing Iñigo to be inside it. In reality, Iñigo's valet, a frog named Jerry, was the only one in the vehicle. Roger is placed in a prison cell, and Nimfa arranges for him to be released. She then visits Jerry, who was brought to a hospital.

Nimfa travels to the countryside for an unannounced visit with her sister Linda and their mother. There, she discovers that Linda has not been going to school at all, and is instead raising a baby with her partner Ramil. Upset at both the lies and the fact that her sister followed her path, Nimfa abandons her family, returns to Batangas with Iñigo, and sleeps with him again. Feeling nauseous the next morning, Nimfa checks in at a hospital and learns that she is nine weeks pregnant. As her affair with Iñigo lasted for only three weeks, she realizes that Roger is the baby's father. She visits Jhermelyn and is stunned to see Roger coming out of Jhermelyn's shower, indicating they are sleeping together. After calling a radio show to talk about her problems, Nimfa visits Iñigo's building. Upon seeing him making out with Marie, she and her get into a fierce fight which Nimfa wins. When Iñigo suggests they both can share him, she promptly rejects and mercilessly knocks him out of a window.

After leaving the building, a recovered Jerry sees Nimfa and takes her to the stew kiosk for a meal. Some time later, Nimfa gives birth to her illegitimate offspring with Roger, and opens up her own sari-sari store.

Voice casts

 Moira Dela Torre as Iñigo's sister, also a wealthy female dog. Lee Morris also appear as an uncredited voice of Iñigo's sister
 Joyce Bernal as an anthropomorphic owl who appears as a doctor, involves Nimfa's pregnancy in the hospital. Sands also appear as an uncredited voice of an owl.
 Claudia Enriquez as Iñigo's mother. Jones also appear as an uncredited voice of Iñigo's mother.

Production
Hayop Ka! marks their first adult animated film produced in the Philippines according to Liongoren, it was first conceptualized after the production of the film Saving Sally, serving as its "thematic opposite." He also said that it took three years to produce Hayop Ka!, and described it as "light and comical". Avid Liongoren, the director of the animation, stated the hope for creating a "Filipino style when it comes to cartoons" and noted that the Philippines has a huge animation industry "that does work for foreign projects." He also hoped it encourages "more local productions" and work for Pinoy animators.

Release
On September 21, 2020, Netflix announced that the film was to be released on October 29.

Reception

Pre-release
In September 2020, Hayop Ka! garnered a mixed reception from netizens. Some demanded that Netflix recast Robin Padilla, who voices Roger in the film, due to Padilla's support of Philippines president Rodrigo Duterte; however, others urged the general public to support the film by watching it for the sake of the Filipino animators and filmmakers behind the project.

Post-release
On Rotten Tomatoes, the film has an approval rating of 88% based on 8 reviews. Chris Sawin of Hub Pages gave the film 4 out of 5 stars and wrote "Hayop Ka! is this unusual yet entertaining animated film driven by a sexual frenzy with an insatiable appetite. The film is a romantic smorgasbord of lust with a final act that is smashed between a triple cheeseburger of twists."

Oggs Cruz of Rappler gave a mixed review and wrote "Hayop Ka! is mostly bark, and barely any bites. It’s sure to give those who want their entertainment laced with skin-deep novelty a jolly good time. However, there’s hardly anything underneath its bawdiness and boisterous gags."

Awards

See also
 Cinema of the Philippines
 List of Philippine films of 2020

References

External links
 
 
 

2020 films
2020 animated films
2020 romantic comedy films
Philippine animated films
Philippine romantic comedy films
Flash animated films
Adult animated films
Tagalog-language films
Animated films about cats
Animated films about dogs
Casting controversies in film